Saburō Takata (高田 三郎, Nagoya 18 December 1913 – 22 October 2000) was a Japanese Roman Catholic composer.

Works, editions and recordings
 Takuboku Tankashu 8 songs  - Recording: Kazumichi Ohno (tenor), Kyosuke Kobayashi (piano). Thorofon 1994

References

1913 births
2000 deaths
20th-century Japanese composers
Composers of Christian music